Juan Ángeles Sánchez (born 16 October 2000) is a Dominican footballer who plays as a forward for Liga Dominicana de Fútbol club Moca and the Dominican Republic national team.

International career
His debut with the Dominican national team was during 2017 Caribbean Cup qualification, on March 29,2016.

References

Juan Ángeles at LDF.com.do

2000 births
Living people
People from Espaillat Province
People from Moca, Dominican Republic
Dominican Republic footballers
Association football midfielders
Dominican Republic international footballers
Dominican Republic under-20 international footballers
Liga Dominicana de Fútbol players